The 2022 Canoe Slalom World Cup was a series of five races in six canoeing and kayaking categories organized by the International Canoe Federation (ICF). It was the 35th edition.

Russia and Belarus were excluded from participation due to the 2022 Russian invasion of Ukraine.

Calendar 
The series opened with World Cup Race 1 in Prague, Czech Republic (10–12 June) and closed with the World Cup Final in La Seu, Spain (2–4 September).

Standings 
The winner of each race was awarded 60 points (with double points awarded for the World Cup Final). Points for lower places differed from one category to another. Every participant was guaranteed at least 2 points for participation and 5 points for qualifying into the semifinal.

Points 
World Cup points were awarded based on the results of each race at each event as follows:

Results

World Cup Race 1 

10–12 June in Prague, Czech Republic.

World Cup Race 2 

17–19 June in Kraków, Poland.

The German team had to withdraw after the heats due to two positive COVID-19 tests within their team.

World Cup Race 3 

24–26 June in Tacen, Slovenia.

World Cup Race 4 

26–28 September in Pau, France.

World Cup Final 

2–4 September in La Seu, Spain.

References

External links 
 International Canoe Federation

Canoe Slalom World Cup
Canoe Slalom World Cup